Test Pattern is an album by Sonia Dada released in 2004 on Razor & Tie Records. The album was released in a gatefold CD/DVD packaging featuring a half-hour short film by Jeth Weinrich, as well as an accompanying montage for the entire album.

The first track, "Moons of Jupiter", samples a female vocal line that was also used at the beginning of the Firefly episode, Heart of Gold.

Track listing

References

2004 albums
Sonia Dada albums